The 1951–52 season was Stoke City's 45th season in the Football League and the 31st in the First Division.

Stoke made a truly awful start to the 1951–52 season claiming just a single point from the first eleven matches. Results slowly started to improve and back to back home wins in the final two matches saw Stoke survive relegation.

Season review

League
In the summer of 1951 there was a major change at boardroom level at Stoke as chairman Mr H. Booth stepped down after 15 years and Mr T. Preece took over in temporary charge. Stoke suffered an opening day mauling at Newcastle United losing 6–0 and it set the tone for a woeful start to the season as they took just two points from the first 22 on offer, finding themselves firmly bedded at the foot of the division. McGrory went out and spent £45,000 on three new players to arrest the decline, he exchanged Albert Mullard plus £10,000 for Alan Martin another £10,000 for Billy McIntosh and again smashed the club's transfer record with the purchase of Northern Irish striker Sammy Smyth for a fee of £25,000. Smyth certainly had the desired impact scoring 12 goals becoming top scorer for the season.

After these arrivals Stoke's form improved and with five straight wins Stoke caught up with the rest of the division however four defeats later they found themselves unable to pull away from a relegation fight. A cruel 5–4 defeat at home to Newcastle did not help, but Stoke somehow managed to take the fight to the final two matches of the season. Stoke had the worst goal average in the division but with both Fulham and Huddersfield Town in terrible form Stoke knew that two more wins would see them safe and that's what they managed leaving them three points clear of Huddersfield.

One interesting scoreline this season came in the League match at Villa Park on 16 February 1952. Aston Villa were on the fringe of forcing themselves in the title race but they came unstuck against a determined Stoke side and lost 3–2. On the scoresheet for the "Potters" was their goalkeeper Dennis Herod who had broken his arm earlier during the match and so swapped positions with left winger Sammy Smyth and went on to score the winning goal five minutes after half time.

FA Cup
After a good win over Sunderland in the third round Stoke were humbled by Third Division South side Swindon Town in a replay.

Final league table

Results

Stoke's score comes first

Legend

Football League First Division

FA Cup

Squad statistics

References

Stoke City F.C. seasons
Stoke City